The Black Sunday bushfires were a series of bushfires that broke out across South Australia on 2 January 1955. Extreme morning temperatures coupled with strong north-westerly winds contributed to the breakout of numerous fires in Adelaide Hills, Jamestown, Waterloo, Kingston and Millicent. Most were caused by sparks from powerlines in the wind.

Around 1,000 Emergency Fire Service volunteers from 60 brigades were tasked to the fires, but were overwhelmed. At 10am, the EFS head office requested urgent public assistance. Around 2,500 citizens volunteered. The fires were contained by 9:30pm, thanks largely to a fortuitous change in the weather and widespread public assistance.

The fires resulted in two deaths, destroyed 40 homes and numerous other buildings, and caused more than 4 million worth of property damage, most notably the destruction of the Governor's summer residence at Marble Hill. Governor Robert George, his family and staff were lucky to escape with their lives. The Premier, Sir Thomas Playford, also narrowly escaped death, sheltering with five other men in a patch of hoed earth near Cherryville.

See also
List of wildfires

References

Bushfires in South Australia
1955 fires in Oceania
1955 in Australia
1950s wildfires
1955 natural disasters
1950s in South Australia
January 1955 events in Australia